Cameroon was set to compete at the 2022 World Championships in Athletics with one athlete, but couldn't due to the athlete not receiving a visa.

Results
(q – qualified, DNS — did not start, NM – no mark, SB – season best)

Men 
Track and road events

References

Nations at the 2022 World Athletics Championships
World Championships in Athletics
Cameroon at the World Championships in Athletics